The Doalnara Restoration Society was established in South Korea in 1980 in accordance with the teachings of Teacher Suk Sun.

Doalnara is a Korean word that, literally translated, means “Stone Country.” Doalnara refers to a society of people with similar goals, whose characters are firm and whose hearts are unchanging as stone. Doalnara developed 10 organic farms in Korea; and there are also Doalnara branches outside of Korea, in the United States, Japan, China, the Philippines, Kenya, Brazil, and more.

Key principles
Doalnara's principles are based on lessons by Teacher Suk Sun, whose teachings include:

First: When you trace back to the origins and root of humanity, we all came from the same parents and are one family. This is not just a sentiment or theory.

Second: All of humanity's countless troubles and problems originate from our hearts. Eliminating selfishness in the heart will change the earth into a happier world.

Third: The true happiness humanity seeks is fulfilled when our household becomes a “mini-heaven”. Not when we "go to" heaven.

The Decalogue
Doalnara keeps the Decalogue, or Ten Commandments, but the commandments are simplified into an easier-to-understand sentence: “With your heart, love your Heavenly Real Parents who begot you, and do not fight with your brethren but live happily.” Doalnara communities do not have or support the use of alcohol, tobacco, violence, verbal and physical abuse, agricultural chemicals, chemical additives, and the like.

Doalnara members observe the Sabbath, from Friday evening to Saturday evening, in accordance with the fourth commandment.

New Agriculture: Respecting the Land 
All Doalnara regions throughout the world adhere to agricultural practices that value the soil and seek to understand nature (instead of using conventional agricultural practices which has a propensity to focus on convenience and economics).  Instead of using chemical fertilizers, pesticides, and/or herbicides, Doalnara only uses organic farming methods with environmental restoration as its highest priority. As a result, all products grown by Doalnara are free from agricultural chemicals.

 

Doalnara members eat foods grown from unharmed and unsprayed soil. Besides sharing and consuming fresh foods, by research and development, Doalnara also uses its produce to make various health food products.

Doalnara organizations
 Doalnara Hannong Educational Center is a place to learn Doalnara lessons, sustainable farming practices, natural diet, and restorative medicine and treatments.
 Doalnara Trade and GB Root is responsible for “Project Guarding Korea” and other overseas agricultural projects.
 Doalnara Certified Organic Korea certifies farms and facilities according to national and international standards as South Korea's second accredited certification body (CB).
 Doalnara Hannong School of the Arts develops future minds and talent in the areas of music, dance, and visual arts.
 Doalnara Hannong Foods makes products from foods grown organically on Doalnara farmlands.
 Hannong Pharmaceutical researches and develops health and treatment products, including Korea's only registered activated-carbon antidote.
 Hannong Steel manufactures materials and products to build better rural residences.
 “Honoring Your Parents Movement” and “Aid the Koreis Movement” are campaigns in operation to raise awareness to create a more respectful and compassionate world.
 Doalnara Arts Group holds modern and traditional music performances.

References

1980 establishments in South Korea
Organizations established in 1980
International organizations based in South Korea
Nondenominational Christian societies and communities